The Office of the President of the Philippines (OP), is an administrative, advisory, and consultative government agency that aids the president of the Philippines in performing their duty as head of state and chief of the executive branch of government.

The office is housed within the Malacañang Palace complex in San Miguel, Manila.

History
The Office of the President (OP) was created through Administrative Order No. 322, s. 1997. The order was issued following the submission of position papers by the officials of the Department of History of the University of the Philippines, and the Board of National Historical Institute which conducted deliberations and consultations in four meetings held at the Malacañang Palace from May 5 to June 25, 1997.

The order established the office retroactively to the date of the date of the Tejeros Convention. The convention was held on March 22, 1897, which saw the election of Emilio Aguinaldo as President of the Revolutionary Government of the Philippines.

The OP was abolished after the capture of Aguinaldo in 1901 by the Americans and was reinstated after the proclamation of the Philippine Commonwealth in 1935.

Then-newly elected President Rodrigo Duterte reorganized the OP on June 30, 2016, when he issued his first Executive Order as president.

Powers

Mandate
The Office of the President's mandate is to provide administrative, advisory, consultative and other support services to the President in the latter's exercise of their powers and functions as Head of State and of the Executive Branch.

Core function
The executive powers of the President under the 1987 Constitution from which the Office of the President mandate emanates, includes among others the President's power of control over all the executive departments, bureaus and offices, and the chief executive departments, bureaus and offices, and the Chief Executive's Constitutional duty to ensure that the laws are faithfully executed. Based on said executive powers of the President, the OP proper would perform the following core functions:

Respond to the specific needs and requirements of the President to achieve the purposes and objectives of the Office and the other agencies under it which include those under the chairmanship of the President, those under the supervision and control of the President, those under the supervision and control/administrative supervision of the OP, those attached to it for policy and program coordination, and those not placed by law or order creating them under any special department
Provide advisory or consultative services to the President in such fields and under such conditions as the President may determine
Provide technical and administrative support on matters concerning development and management, general government administration and internal administration
Provide direct services to the President and, for this purpose, attend to functions and matters that are personal and pertain to the First Family.

Attached agencies
 Anti-Red Tape Authority (ARTA)
 Authority of the Freeport Area of Bataan (AFAB)
 Bases Conversion and Development Authority (BCDA)
 Cagayan Special Economic Zone (CSEZ)
 Climate Change Commission (CCC)
 Commission on Higher Education (CHED)
 Komisyon sa Wikang Filipino (KWF)
 Cultural Center of the Philippines (CCP)
 Dangerous Drugs Board (DDB)
 Film Development Council of the Philippines (FDCP)
 Games and Amusements Board (GAB)
 National Historical Commission of the Philippines (NHCP)
 Metropolitan Manila Development Authority (MMDA)
 Metropolitan Waterworks and Sewerage System (MWSS)
 Mindanao Development Authority (MinDA)
 Movie and Television Review and Classification Board (MTRCB)
 National Archives of the Philippines (NAP)
 National Commission for Culture and the Arts (NCCA)
 National Commission of Senior Citizens (NCSC)
 National Council on Disability Affairs (NCDA)
 National Economic and Development Authority (NEDA)
 National Intelligence Coordinating Agency (NICA)
 National Security Council (NSC)
 National Solid Waste Management Commission (NSWMC)
 Office of the Presidential Adviser on the Peace Process (OPAPP)
 Optical Media Board (OMB)
 Philippine Center on Transnational Crime (PCTC)
 Philippine Charity Sweepstakes Office (PCSO)
 Philippine Competition Commission (PCC)
 Philippine Drug Enforcement Agency (PDEA)
 Philippine Information Agency (PIA)
 Philippine Postal Corporation (PHLPost)
 Philippine Reclamation Authority (PRA)
 Philippine Space Agency (PhilSA)
 Philippine Sports Commission (PSC)
 Presidential Anti-Corruption Commission (PACC)
 Presidential Security Group (PSG)
 Subic Bay Metropolitan Authority (SBMA)

Former attached agencies
Listed below are agencies that have been abolished, transferred, integrated, merged, reorganized or renamed into the existing attached agencies under the Office of the President and the executive departments of the Philippines.
 Cooperative Development Authority (CDA) – transferred to the Department of Trade and Industry
 Fertilizer and Pesticide Authority (FPA) – transferred to the Department of Agriculture
 Housing and Urban Development Coordinating Council (HUDCC) – abolished, merged with HLURB to establish the DHSUD by virtue of Republic Act No. 11201
 National Anti-Poverty Commission (NAPC) – transferred to the Department of Social Welfare and Development
 National Commission on Indigenous Peoples (NCIP) – transferred to the Department of Social Welfare and Development
 National Commission on Muslim Filipinos (NCMF) – transferred to the Department of the Interior and Local Government
 National Food Authority (NFA) –  transferred to the Department of Agriculture
 National Museum (NM) – renamed as National Museum of the Philippines (NMP), reorganized and attached solely to DepEd for budgetary purposes by virtue of Republic Act No. 11333
 National Youth Commission (NYC) – transferred to Department of the Interior and Local Government
 Pasig River Rehabilitation Commission (PRRC) – abolished by virtue of Executive Order No. 93, s. 2019All Powers and Functions transferred to the Department of Environment and Natural Resources and Manila Bay Task Force.
 Philippine Coconut Authority (PCA) – transferred to the Department of Agriculture
 Philippine Commission on Women (PCW) – transferred to the Department of the Interior and Local Government
 Presidential Commission for the Urban Poor (PCUP) – transferred to the Department of Social Welfare and Development
 Technical Education and Skills Development Authority (TESDA) – transferred to the Department of Trade and Industry
 Presidential Anti-Corruption Commission (PACC) - abolished by virtue of Executive Order No. 1, s. 2022. All powers and functions transferred to the Office of the Deputy Executive Secretary for Legal Affairs.
 Office of the Cabinet Secretary - abolished by virtue of Executive Order No. 1, s. 2022. All powers and functions transferred to the Presidential Management Staff.
 Commission on Information and Communications Technology - abolished by virtue of Executive Order No. 47, s. 2011,  Merged with DOST-Information and Communications Technology Office and all operating units of the Department of Transportation and Communications (DOTC) with functions and responsibilities dealing with communications to establish the Department of Information and Communications Technology by virtue of Republic Act No. 10844.
 Office of the Presidential Spokesperson - abolished by virtue of Executive Order No. 2, s. 2022. All powers and functions transferred to the Office of the Press Secretary.

See also 
 List of presidents of the Philippines
 Office of the Vice President of the Philippines

References

 
President, Office of the
Malacañang Palace
1897 establishments in the Philippines
Presidency of the Philippines